Bryant Pond may refer to:

 Bryant Pond, Maine, also known as Lake Christopher, a lake in Maine
Bryant Pond, Maine, a village in Maine on the shores of Lake Christopher
Bryant Pond (New York), a lake in New York